Sabine Deitmer (21 October 1947 – 11 January 2020) was a German crime writer known for her character, Beate Stein.

Life
Sabine Deitmer was born in Jena in Germany in 1947 and brought up in Düsseldorf before studying literature and languages in Bonn. By, Bye, Bruno was her first published novel which she wrote after travelling to Brighton, Bristol, Berlin and Lake Constance. She lived in the Ruhr.

Work
 Perfekte Pläne, 
 Scharfe Stiche, 2004, 
 Die schönsten Männer der Stadt, 1997, 
 NeonNächte, 1995, 
 Dominante Damen (Kriminalroman), 1994, 
 Kalte Küsse (Kriminalroman), 1993, 
 Auch brave Mädchen tun's (Mordgeschichten), 1990, 
 Bye-bye, Bruno. Wie Frauen morden (Kriminalgeschichten), 1988,

References

External links 
Sabine Deitmer in: NRW Literatur im Netz 

1947 births
2020 deaths
Writers from Jena
German women novelists
Women mystery writers
German crime fiction writers
20th-century German novelists
20th-century German women writers
21st-century German novelists
21st-century German women writers